The WWF Light Heavyweight Championship was a professional wrestling championship in the World Wrestling Federation (WWF, now WWE) promotion. The title was challenged by light heavyweights at a maximum weight of 215 lbs (before deactivation, the weight limit was changed to 220Ibs). It was created on March 26, 1981 for the Universal Wrestling Association (UWA) in a partnership between the WWF and UWA. On 16 June 1995, the title moved to Michinoku Pro Wrestling, but due to WWF's ownership of the title, it was returned to the WWF in 1997, the year which WWE recognizes as the beginning of the championship's lineage. The inaugural champion in UWA was Perro Aguayo, however, the WWE considers the inaugural champion to be Taka Michinoku, with his reign beginning on December 7, 1997. It was retired on March 8, 2002 with X-Pac as the final champion.

History

1997 tournament

Notes:
1 
2 
3 
4

Title deactivation
In March 2001, the WWF purchased World Championship Wrestling. Following the conclusion of the Invasion angle at the 2001 Survivor Series pay-per-view, the WWF Light Heavyweight Championship was abandoned in favor of the WCW Cruiserweight Championship (a unification match at Survivor Series was cancelled due to X-Pac's injury). The Light Heavyweight Championship was defended by X-Pac at house shows until March 8, 2002, when WWF finally deactivated the title. Simultaneously, the WCW Cruiserweight Championship was rebranded as the WWF Cruiserweight Championship. It would become the WWE Cruiserweight Championship in accordance with the company's name change in May 2002, and it would be defended until September 2007.

Reigns 

The WWF Light Heavyweight Championship was first introduced in Japan in a tournament which ended with Perro Aguayo defeating Gran Hamada to become the first recognized champion. It then migrated to the US West Coast before transitioning to Mexico and then later being defended once again in Japan by way of the Michinoku Pro Wrestling promotion. The title would later become popularized and widely defended within the confines of the World Wrestling Federation in 1997, when a tournament was held in the United States to crown a champion. Before the tournament, the title was previously considered a part of the much venerated J-Crown.

See also
NWA World Junior Heavyweight Championship, predecessor in Jim Crockett Promotions
WCW Light Heavyweight Championship
 WWA Light Heavyweight Championship
WWE Cruiserweight Championship (1996–2007)
NXT Cruiserweight Championship

References

External links
1997 WWF event results
1997 tournament results
WWF Light Heavyweight Title History
Wrestling-Titles.com: WWF World Light Heavyweight Title
WWE Cruiserweight Championship Title History
WWF Light Heavyweight Title in Cagematch.com database

Light heavyweight wrestling championships
Universal Wrestling Association championships
WWE championships